Diggins or Diggin may refer to:

Places
Diggins, Missouri

People
Bartholomew Diggins (1844–1917), American Civil War Navy sailor
Ben Diggins (born 1979), American Major League Baseball player
Brighton Diggins (1906–1971), Australian rules footballer
Jay Diggins (born 1974), English musician
Jessie Diggins (born 1991), American cross-country skier
John Patrick Diggins (1935–2009), American history professor
Paul Diggin (born 1985), British rugby player
Skylar Diggins-Smith (born 1990), American basketball player

See also
Dwiggins, a surname